The Dream Bridge ( Yume-no-ōhashi) is a bridge in Odaiba, Tokyo, Japan. It crosses the Ariake West Canal within the Symbol Promenade Park, and is only open to pedestrian and bicycle traffic. It was the location of the 2020 Summer Olympics cauldron in 2021.

External links

 

Bridges in Tokyo
Odaiba